The Rt Rev Robert Bickersteth FRS (24 August 1816 – 15 April 1884) was the Anglican Bishop of Ripon in the mid 19th century.

Life
Robert Bickersteth was born into an ecclesiastical family, the son of Rev. John Bickersteth, sometime Rector of Sapcote. His brother Edward was a Dean of Lichfield. His uncle was Edward was also a priest and Edward Bickersteth, Bishop of Exeter was his cousin. Another uncle, a prominent barrister, was raised to the peerage as Baron Langdale. He was educated at Queens' College, Cambridge. Ordained in 1845, his first post was as a curate to his father. After a further curacy in Reading he became Rector of St John's, Clapham  and then of St Giles in the Fields. Between 1854 and 1857 he was a canon at Salisbury Cathedral when he was elevated to the episcopate as the Bishop of Ripon, a post he held until his death.

He was elected a Fellow of the Royal Society in 1858.

His son, also named Robert Bickersteth, was a Liberal MP.

He consecrated the church of St Thomas the Apostle, Killinghall on 29 July 1880.

Works

 The Social Effects of the Reformation (1859)
 Romanism in its relation to the second coming of Christ (1854)
 The Gifts of the Kingdom. Being Lectures Delivered During Lent (1855)

External links
Bibliographic directory from Project Canterbury

Notes

1816 births
1884 deaths
Alumni of Queens' College, Cambridge
19th-century Church of England bishops
Bishops of Ripon (modern diocese)
Fellows of the Royal Society
Robert, bishop